The 2012 Saginaw Sting season is the fourth season for the Continental Indoor Football League (CIFL) franchise.

On November 11, 2011, Esposito sold his rights to operate the team to Schweigert, Rob Licht and Jim O'Brien. The new ownership announced the same day that they would be moving the team back to the CIFL. On December 29, 2011, the Sting announced that 2011 interim head coach Vince Leveille would return as the full-time head coach for the 2012 season, but just 11 days before the team's first game, Leveille stepped down as the head coach, citing that his full-time job made him unavailable to do both. Defensive Coordinator Fred Townsend took over as the team's head coach.

With an 8–0 record, the Sting returned to the CIFL playoffs for the first time since 2008, when they won the 2008 CIFL Championship Game and finished the season as the Atlantic Conferences's #2 seed.

In the 2012 CIFL Championship Game, the Sting defeated the Dayton Silverbacks 35-7, to win the CIFL championship. The title for the Sting was their 3rd in the last 4 seasons of playing.

Players

Free agents

Final roster

Regular season

Schedule

Standings

Week 2: vs Chicago Vipers

Week 3: vs Indianapolis Enforcers

The Sting set a CIFL record by scoring 91 point in a single game. The previous high has been the Rochester Raiders in a 90-45 win over Lehigh Valley Outlawz on May 7, 2006.

Week 4: vs Evansville Rage

With the win, the Sting improved to 3-0.

Coaching staff

References

2012 Continental Indoor Football League season
Saginaw Sting
Saginaw Sting